Koito is a Kalenjin wedding ritual.

Koito may also refer to:

 Koito (rapper) (born 1986), Italian rapper
 Koito Industries Ltd
 Koito River, Chiba Prefecture, Japan

See also
 Koit (disambiguation)